is a Japanese television and radio broadcaster in Kagawa and Okayama. The abbreviation, RNC originates in the radio service name (Radio Nishinippon Broadcasting Company, 西日本放送ラジオ).  It is affiliated with Japan Radio Network (JRN), National Radio Network (NRN), Nippon News Network (NNN), and Nippon Television Network System (NNS).

Offices 
 Headquarters (RNC Takamatsu) - 8-15, Marunouchi, Takamatsu, Kagawa, Japan
 Chūgoku General Branch Office (RNC Okayama) - 2-5, Noda San-chōme, Kita-ku, Okayama, Okayama, Japan
 Seisan Branch Office - 538, Dokichōhigashi Hatchōme, Marugame, Kagawa, Japan
 Kurashiki Branch Office - 24-7, Chūō Itchōme, Kurashiki, Okayama, Japan
 Tokyo Branch Office - 5-6, Ginza hatchōme, Chūō, Tokyo, Japan
 Osaka Branch Office - 2-6, Dōjimahama Itchōme, Kita-ku, Osaka, Osaka, Japan
 Hiroshima Branch Office - 13-14, Noborichō, Naka-ku, Hiroshima, Hiroshima, Japan

Network

TV 
 Nippon News Network (NNN) and Nippon Television Network System

Radio 
 Japan Radio Network (JRN)
 National Radio Network (NRN)

Stations

Radio 
 Takamatsu JOKF 1449 kHz 5 kW
 Kan'onji 1449 kHz 100W
 Marugame 1449 kHz 1 kW 
 Shirotori 1449 kHz 100W

TV 
Customary, they called their main station "Takamatsu", however actually it located at top of the Mt. Kinkōzan in "Okayama" as the other rival companies, such as KSB, RSK, OHK, TSC and NHK Okayama.

Analog 
 Takamatsu (de facto Okayama) JOKF-TV 9CH 10 kW

 Kagawa
 Maedayama 41CH 5 kW
 Nishisanuki 50CH 3 kW
 Shōdoshima 61CH 300W
 Shionoe V12CH 3W
 Takuma 37CH 1W
 Tonoshō 47CH 10W
 Shido 54CH 10W
 Shirotori 54CH 10W
 Kokubunji 54CH 3W
 Mino 56CH 10W
 Shōdoshima-Ikeda 57CH 3W
 Sakaidehigashi 58CH 10W
 Ritsurinkita 59CH 10W
 Ritsurinminami 61CH 10W
 Kan'onji 62CH 10W
 Sakaidenishi 62CH 10W
 Nio 62CH 3W
 Ayakami 62CH 3W

 Okayama
 Tsuyama 58CH 500W
 Kasaoka V34CH 300W
 Mizushima V14CH 10W
 Okayamakita 14CH 10W
 Tamashima V26CH 3W
 Takahashi 28CH 10W
 Niimi 28CH 30W
 Kuse 28CH 10W
 Mimasaka 28CH 3W
 Tsuyamaminami 31CH 3W
 Hokubō 38CH 10W
 Bizen 40CH 3W
 Okutsu-Ōtsuri 44CH 10W
 Wake 47CH 10W
 Okayamahigashi 54CH 3W
 Ibara 54CH 3W
 Kojima 59CH 30W
 Sōja 62CH 10W etc...

Digital (Virtual channel:4) 
 Takamatsu (de facto Okayama) JOKF-DTV 20CH 2 kW

 Kagawa
 Maedayama 15CH 500W
 Nishisanuki 15CH 100W
 Shōdoshima 20CH 30W
 Nio 20CH 1W
 Shirotori 20CH 1W
 Tonoshō 34CH 1W
 Sakaidehigashi 41CH 1W
 Ayakami 34CH 0.3W
 Kan'onji 34CH 0.3W
 Kokubunji 34CH 0.3W
 Takuma 41CH 0.1W
 Takuma-Nabuto 20CH 0.05W
 Takuma-Namari 15CH 0.01W

 Okayama
 Tsuyama 15CH 50W
 Kasaoka V20CH 30W
 Kojima 15CH 3W
 Niimi 20CH 3W
 Hiruzen 20CH 3W
 Kuse 15CH 1W
 Takahashi 15CH 1W
 Wake 15CH 1W
 San'yō 34CH 1W
 Hokubō 34CH 1W
 Ibara 15CH 0.3W
 Susai 15CH 0.3W
 Bizen-Saeki 15CH 0.3W etc...

Program

Radio 
 Sawayaka Radio kibun jyō-jyō!
 Music In Lunch Box
 Kokoro Ni Hana Ni Ichirin
 Marunaka Olive Onsen Karaoke Stage
 Kon-nichiwa! Kagawakendesu
 Kimamani Radio Amenohi Harenohi Kumorinohi
 RNC TODAY
 Naminori Radio Week End Fever
 Ongaku Konjaku Monogatari Nichiyō RadiOn
 Tango Album

TV 
 RNC News Spot
 Midokoro-RAN
 RNC Excellent Shop 
 Jyōhō Āru
 RNC news every.
 Doki
 Shiawase Kibun!
 JUST NEWS
 Dreamers - Chihōjidaino Leader Tachi -

Item 
THE SHIKOKU SHIMBUN

External links 
RNC HomePage

Nippon News Network
Television stations in Japan
Radio in Japan
Radio stations established in 1953
Television channels and stations established in 1958
Mass media in Takamatsu, Kagawa
1953 establishments in Japan